Eristoff Vodka (air-wrist-off) originated from Georgia and was first created for Prince Eristavi of Duchy of Racha in 1806.

Made from 100% grain spirit, Eristoff vodka is triple distilled and then charcoal filtered, a technique first established in 18th century Russia.

The Eristoff logo of a wolf howling at a crescent moon represents the Persian name for Georgia, Gorjestan, meaning "land of the wolf". Today, Georgia is still home to the grey wolf, which for hundreds of years has been a part of Georgian culture and folklore.

History

The original Georgian version of the name Eristoff or Eristov was Eristavi (ერისთავი). The title means ‘head of the nation’ but translates more accurately as ‘head of a military force’. By the 19th century, five noble families each representing a different part of Georgia were using the name Eristhavi. Prince Ivane Eristoff who first created Eristoff vodka in 1806 was from the northwest province of Racha.

A landmark in the history of the Eristoff family and Eristoff vodka came in the late 19th century when Ivane’s great grandson, Prince Alexander Constantine Eristoff moved from Georgia to Saint Petersburg. Prince Alexander went on to enjoy a distinguished military career eventually reaching the rank of Colonel in the Imperial Guard. 

After the Soviet takeover the Eristovs were forced to leave Georgia, as they were likely to be sent to Siberia. One Eristavi from America serves as the new Jersey state treasurer.

Flavours
Eristoff is also available in four flavours.
 Eristoff Red: sloe berry flavour (Domi wodka)
 Eristoff Black: wild berry flavour
 Eristoff Pink: wild strawberry flavour
 Eristoff Lime: lime flavour

Land of the Wolf
Reflecting its Georgian origins, "Land of the Wolf" is the new global advertising campaign for Eristoff. The campaign, which includes a 60-second cinema advert, takes as its inspiration the legends and folklore which surround the wolf.

Accolades

The Eristoff flagship (unflavored) vodka has performed well in recent spirit ratings competitions.  The Beverage Testing Institute, for example, gave Eristoff scores of 90-94 in the years between 2011 and 2014.  As of September 2014, Proof66 listed Eristoff among its Top 20 vodkas.

See also
Nemiroff
Absolut Vodka

References

External links

Eristoff Vodka review 
Eristoff: One of the best Vodkas available in India 
/ fastest growing global brand

Georgian vodkas
Bacardi